

Geography 
Chennevières is the name or part of the name of two communes of France:
 Chennevières-lès-Louvres in the Val-d'Oise département
 Chennevières-sur-Marne in the Val-de-Marne département

People 
 Charles-Philippe de Chennevières-Pointel, a French writer and art historian